Mirza Habibollah Shirazi, known as Qaani (‎, 20 October 1808 – 4 May 1854) was one of the most famous poets of the Qajar era. He was born in 1808 in Shiraz, where he attended elementary school. At an early age, Qaani went to Mashhad for further study. He wrote a poem to praise Fath Ali Shah Qajar during the former's visit to Tehran, and called him "Mojtahed of the Poets".

Qaani was born in 1808. He studied Arab and Persian literature and had great interest in hekmat. He was familiar with French and English, and was knowledgeable in mathematics and rhetoric. In logic he was considered a master.

Qaani's Diwan (poetry collection) consisted of over 20,000 verses. He wrote a book named Parishaan, in the style of Sa'di's Golestan. He died in 1854 in Rey.

References

Further reading
 

Iranian male poets
People of Qajar Iran
19th-century Persian-language poets
People from Shiraz